was a town located in Ayauta District, Kagawa Prefecture, Japan.

As of 2003, the town had an estimated population of 6,720 and a density of 94.38 persons per km². The total area was 71.20 km².

On March 21, 2006, Ayakami, along with the town of Ryōnan (also from Ayauta District), was merged to create the town of Ayagawa.

External links
 Official website of Ayagawa 

Dissolved municipalities of Kagawa Prefecture
Ayagawa, Kagawa